The 2013 Bank of America 500 was a NASCAR Sprint Cup Series stock car race held on October 12, 2013, at Charlotte Motor Speedway in Concord, North Carolina. Contested over 334 laps on the 1.5-mile (2.4 km) asphalt quad-oval, it was the thirty-first race of the 2013 Sprint Cup Series season, as well as the fifth race in the ten-race Chase for the Sprint Cup, which ends the season. Brad Keselowski won the race, his first of the season, while Kasey Kahne finished second and Matt Kenseth finished third. This was the first time since October 2011 that a Chase race was "spoiled" by a non-Chase driver.

This race also marked the first Cup Series start for 2021 champion Kyle Larson.

Background

Entry list

Final Practice Results

Qualifying results

Race summary
Dale Earnhardt Jr. helped to enhance fuel injection research for NASCAR as he was leading lap 34 out of 334. His contribution to the fledgling technology came in the form of driving the one-millionth mile with an electronic fuel injection system.

Race results

References

Bank of America 500
Bank of America 500
NASCAR races at Charlotte Motor Speedway